Panglong (Paang⁰long⁰, ;) is a town in Loilem Township of Loilem District, southern Shan State, Myanmar. The town is also home to Panglong University.

History
Since 1957, Panglong has served as the headquarters of the Shan monastic education under the administration of the Shan State Sangha Council, with its main base at Wat Pitakat. The Shan State Sangha Councial is also responsible for the project of translating the Buddhist canonical texts, tipitaka, into the Shan language. The project was founded and sponsored by Sao Shwe Thaike, the Saopha (ruling prince) of Yawnghwe State and the first president of the Union of Burma (now Myanmar).

This town was the site where the Panglong Agreement took place during the Panglong Conference.

Just over a mile to the north of the town, there are two important places. One is the Panglong University. And, the other one is the Nang Kin Pu Pagoda, which has historical link with a myth of Nang Kin Pu or the Crab Eating Lady, with archaeological sites surrounding the area connected to the story.

References

Townships of Shan State
Loilen District